The Murders is a Canadian police procedural drama television series created by Damon Vignale. Starring Jessica Lucas and produced by Muse Entertainment in conjunction with Rogers Media, the series debuted on Citytv and FX in Canada on March 25, 2019.

Cast and characters
Jessica Lucas as Kate Jameson, a rookie homicide detective
Lochlyn Munro as Mike Huntley, Jameson's original homicide detective partner
Dylan Bruce as Nolan Wells, Jameson's replacement homicide detective partner
Terry Chen as Staff Sergeant Bill Chen
Luvia Petersen as Detective Meg Harris
Venus Terzo as Rita Gallo, Jameson's mother

Episodes

International broadcast
In February 2019, NBCUniversal International Networks acquired the series for its Universal TV and 13th Street channels in Africa, France, Germany, Poland, Spain, and the United Kingdom.

References

External links
 
 

2010s Canadian crime drama television series
Citytv original programming
2019 Canadian television series debuts
Television shows filmed in Vancouver
Television shows set in Vancouver
Canadian police procedural television series